These noted people were born, raised or lived for a significant period of time in the city of Danville, Kentucky.

See also
 List of people from Kentucky

References

 
Danville, Kentucky
Danville